Dirk Jens Nonnenmacher (born 3 June 1963) was the CEO and chairman of HSH Nordbank. A trained mathematician, Nonnenmacher worked for several private banks before joining HSH Nordbank in 2007. He became chairman in November 2008, succeeding  and left the bank in March 2011.

He earned his habilitation in 1993.

References

1963 births
Living people
German bankers
Businesspeople from Karlsruhe
University of Ulm alumni